Charles Maitland Hallard (26 October 1865 – 21 April 1942) was a Scottish actor. In 1895 he appeared in the popular drama Trilby with Herbert Beerbohm Tree at the Haymarket Theatre.

Selected filmography

 Convict 99 (1919) - Ralph Vickers
 The Bridal Chair (1919) - Lord Louis Lewis
 Faith (1919) - Lord Louis Lewis
 Gamblers All (1919) - John Leighton
 Edge O' Beyond (1919) - Captain Burnett
 Mrs. Thompson (1919) - Prentice
 The Elder Miss Blossom (1919) - Andrew Quick
 Faith (1919) - Lord Louis Lewis
 The Husband Hunter (1920) - Sir Robert Chester
 Love in the Wilderness (1920) - Keith Meredith
 Her Story (1920) - Ashelyn
 The Case of Lady Camber (1920) - Sir Bedford Slufter
 The Pauper Millionaire (1922) - Pye Smith
 In the Night (1922) - The Stranger
 Carry On (1927) - John Peters
 A Light Woman (1928) - Marquis de Vargas
 Knowing Men (1930) - Marquis de Jarnais
 The W Plan (1930) - Commander-in-Chief
 Two Worlds (1930) - Col. von Zaminsky
 Almost a Honeymoon (1930) - Sir James Jephson
 Compromising Daphne (1930) - Mr. Ponsonby
 The Woman Between (1931) - Earl Bellingdon
 Tell England (1931) - The Colonel
 Strictly Business (1931) - Mr. Plummett
 The Chinese Puzzle (1932) - Sir Aylmer Brent
 On Secret Service (1933) - Colonel von Waldmuller
 Rolling in Money (1934) - Carter
 The Third Clue (1934) - Gabriel Wells
 The Riverside Murder (1935) - Dickenson - Norman's Attorney
 Royal Cavalcade (1935) - Winston Churchill
 Night Mail (1935) - Sir Jacob March
 Moscow Nights (1935) - President of Court Martial
 King of the Damned (1935) - Commandant Courvin
 Jack of All Trades (1936) - Henry Kilner
 The Live Wire (1937) - Sir George Dawson
 The Sky's the Limit (1938) - Lord Morgan (Last appearance)

References

External links

1865 births
1942 deaths
Scottish male stage actors
Scottish male film actors
Scottish male television actors
Scottish male silent film actors
Male actors from Edinburgh
20th-century Scottish male actors